Everyman's Feast, also known as Jedermanns Fest, is a 2002 Austrian drama film written and directed by . It was entered into the 24th Moscow International Film Festival.

Plot
Jan Jedermann (played by Klaus Maria Brandauer) is an ingenious fashion designer, but also an unscrupulous showman. He dies in a car accident and ruminates during his last hours about how one more night in his life could have gone by. He just cannot accept that Death comes to get him on the evening of his greatest triumph, a fashion show set on the roof of the Vienna Opera. He makes a pact with Death, allowing him to remain among the living at least until the morning.

Cast
 Klaus Maria Brandauer as Jan Jedermann
 Juliette Gréco as Yvonne Becker
 Redbad Klynstra as Daniel
 Sylvie Testud as Sophie
 Alexa Sommer as Isabelle
 Veronika Lucanska as Cocaine
 Susan Lynch as Maria
 Piotr Wawrzynczak as Jurek

References

External links

Jedermanns Fest

2002 films
2002 drama films
Austrian drama films
2000s German-language films
Films about fashion designers
Films about death
Everyman